Oakdale School, also known as Building 401, is a historic one-room school building located within Big Oaks National Wildlife Refuge (formerly Jefferson Proving Ground) in Monroe Township, Jefferson County, Indiana. It was built in 1869, and is a one-story, rectangular limestone building.  It measures 24 feet wide and 30 feet deep, and has a front gable roof.

It was listed on the National Register of Historic Places in 1993.

References

One-room schoolhouses in Indiana
School buildings on the National Register of Historic Places in Indiana
School buildings completed in 1869
Buildings and structures in Jefferson County, Indiana
National Register of Historic Places in Jefferson County, Indiana